The women's 4 × 100 m freestyle relay 34 points event at the 2012 Summer Paralympics took place at the  London Aquatics Centre on 3 September. There were no heats in this event.

Results

Final
Competed at 20:28.

 
WR = World Record. EU = European Record. AS = Asian Record.

References
Official London 2012 Paralympics Results: Final 

Swimming at the 2012 Summer Paralympics
2012 in women's swimming